Typical format for telephone numbers in Bhutan are: +975 XX XXXXXX (mobile) and +975 X XXXXXX (fixed line).

Fixed Line

National Significant Numbers (NSN): seven digits
Area code length: one digit
Subscriber number length: six digits

Format: +975 X XXXXXX

Area codes
List of area codes:

2 - Thimphu, Simtokha, Dechencholing, Taba, Kharsadrapchu, Basochu, Wangdue, Punakha, Lingshi DAMA, Gasa
3 - Trongsa, Jakar, Chumey, Zhemgang DAMA, Zhemgang, Tingtibi
4 - Trashigang, Kanglung, Lhuntse, Tangmachu, Rangjung, Wamrong, Khaling, Mongar, Sakteng DAMA, Gelpoyshing, Trashi Yangtse, Tsenkharla
5 - Phuntsholing, Pasakha, Gedu, Tala, Padechu, Sinchekha, Lhamoi Zingkha, Samtse, Gomtu, Chargary, Sibsoo
6 - Gelephu, Suray, Lodrai, Sarpang, Tsirang, Damphu DAMA, Dagana, Dagapela, Drujegang, Panbang DAMA
7 - Jongkhar, Deothang, Nganglam, Bangtar DAMA, Daifam DAMA, Nganglam DAMA, Gatshel, Gatshel DAMA
8 - Paro, Drukgyel Dzong, Shaba, Ha, Damthang, Chapcha, Wangkha, Tsimasham

Mobile Operator

Mobile numbers: eight digit NSN
Mobile operator code : two digit
Subscriber number : six digits

Format: +975 XX XXXXXX

Mobile operator codes

17 - B-Mobile
16 - B-Mobile
77 - TashiCell
02 - Fixline

Special number

110 - Fire department
112 - Emergency medical services
113 - Police
1600 - Bhutan Telecom

References

Communications in Bhutan
Bhutan
Bhutan communications-related lists